Rebecca Miano is a Kenyan lawyer, who is currently the Cabinet Secretary for the East African Community, Arid and Semi Arid Lands and Regional Development in the 5th Government of Kenya, headed by president William Ruto. She is a corporate executive who, since November 2017, has served as the managing director and chief executive officer of KenGen Plc., the largest producer of electricity in the East African region. She was confirmed on 1 November 2017, having served in acting capacity since August 2017.

Background and education
She holds a Bachelor of Laws from the University of Nairobi and attended the Advocates Training Programme at the Kenya School of Law She also holds a Master of Laws in Comparative Law, awarded by the Australian National University.

Career
Rebecca Miano first worked at a Nairobi-based law firm, "Musyoka Annan & Company Advocates". Later, she worked at "Slater and Gordon", a law firm in Queensland, Australia. In 1998, she joined Kenya Electricity Generating Company (KenGen), as assistant legal officer. Over time, she rose in rank to become assistant company secretary. At the time of her promotion to Acting Managing Director, in August 2017, she was the Director of Legal Affairs and Company Secretary at KenGen, serving n both roles since 2008.

In November 2017, she beat 90 other applicants and was appointed to her current position, replacing Albert Mugo  , who retired after attaining the mandatory retirement age of 60 years.She is currently the Cabinet Secretary for East Africa Community and Arid and Semi Arid Lands. This announcement was made on the 27th of September 2022 by H.E Dr. William Samoei Ruto at State House, Kenya.

Other considerations
Miano is the first female chief executive at KenGen. As of November 2017, she is one of the only two women in Kenya who lead a parastatal company, the only other woman being MaryJane Mwangi, the chief executive officer of National Oil Corporation of Kenya. She is a member of the Law Society of Kenya, and a member of the Institute of Certified Public Secretaries of Kenya. In 2010, she was decorated with the Order of the Grand Warrior of Kenya in recognition of her body of work. In August 2020, Rebecca's exemplary leadership and outstanding corporate governance was awarded in the African Business Leadership Awards by African Leadership Magazine she won under the African Inspirational Business Leadership Award Category. Miano was appointed by the World Bank Group as a participating member to the Advisory Council on Gender and Development in June 2021 where she was to serve a-two-year-term.

See also
Kenya Power and Lighting Company
Kenya Electricity Transmission Company
Energy in Kenya

References

External links
Website of the Kenya Electricity Generating Company Limited

1966 births
Living people
University of Nairobi alumni
Kenya School of Law alumni
Australian National University alumni
20th-century Kenyan lawyers
Kenyan women lawyers
Kenyan business executives
Kenyan women business executives
Kenyan chief executives